La Vounaise is a village and former municipality in the district of Broye in the canton of Fribourg, Switzerland.

In 1981 the municipality was incorporated into the larger, neighboring municipality Murist.

Coat of arms
The blazon of the district coat of arms is Argent, a [double] Rose Gules seeded Or and barbed Vert.

References

Former municipalities of the canton of Fribourg
Villages in the canton of Fribourg